Two ships of the French Navy have borne the name Jules Verne in honour of  science-fiction writer Jules Verne:
  (1931–1961), a submarine tender
 , a repair ship launched in 1970 as Achéron; scrapped in 2016

French Navy ship names